University of Guam Press is a university press affiliated with the University of Guam, located in Mangilao, Guam. Most of the publisher's releases focus on the "peoples and cultures of the Micronesian Islands". The press also manages Proa Publications, the official publishing outlet of Northern Marianas College. The University of Guam Press is currently an affiliate of the Association of University Presses.

See also

 List of English-language book publishing companies
 List of university presses

References

External links 
University of Guam Press

University of Guam Press
University of Guam Press